Agia Roumeli is a small village in southwest Crete, Greece and is popular with tourists.

Background

Located a few kilometers above the town is the southern entrance to the Samaria Gorge. For most walkers, this is the exit, as the usual route through the gorge is to descend from the north. The gorge is a popular tourist destination in Crete, the longest gorge in Greece, and one of the longest in Europe, measuring 18 km. The village has several hotels and a few rooms for rent and also some tavernas. Agia Roumeli has a large beach and a ferry slipway where the ferry to and from Hora Sfakion via Loutro, arrives, mainly used by walkers who have completed the Samaria walk. The village is not accessible by road.

According to one local source, the name comes from a corruption of the Arabic words Maya (وأتر) meaning water, and Roumi (رومى) meaning Byzantine Greeks, indicating a place of "Greek/Roman water", possibly a reference to the Samaria Gorge or a nearby spring. If this origin is true, it is possible that it was named when the island was controlled by the Emirate of Crete, or later under the Ottoman Empire.  However, it is also possible the name refers to or evolved into a reference to Saint Romula (or Romylia), a minor saint of Late Antiquity in the Eastern Orthodox Church.

References

Populated places in Chania (regional unit)